Phacopsis vulpina is a species of lichenicolous (lichen-dwelling) fungus in the family Parmeliaceae, and the type species of the genus Phacopsis. It was formally described as a new species in 1852 by French mycologist Edmond Tulasne. The fungus is restricted to the genus Letharia as a host and consequently has a Northern Hemisphere distribution. Externally, it is somewhat similar in appearance to P. lethariellae, but P. vulpina does not have a brown hypothecium (the  area of tissue in the apothecium immediately below the subhymenium).

References

Parmeliaceae
Fungi described in 1852
Taxa named by Edmond Tulasne
Lichenicolous fungi